Glaucocharis torva is a moth in the family Crambidae. It was described by Thomas Pennington Lucas in 1898. It is found in Australia.

References

Diptychophorini
Moths described in 1898